Stadion Ogosta is a multi-purpose stadium in Montana, Bulgaria.  It is currently used for football matches and is the home ground of local football club PFC Montana.  The stadium has a seating capacity of 6,000 spectators.

The record attendance at the stadium is 11,500 during a game between PFC Montana and CSKA Sofia.
The stadium's name is derived from the river Ogosta, which passes through the club's namesake town.

References

Football venues in Bulgaria
Montana, Bulgaria
Buildings and structures in Montana Province